The 2013 Big East Conference men's soccer season is the inaugural season for the newly formed offshoot of the original Big East Conference. The "new" Big East consists of the seven members of the original Big East that did not sponsor Division I FBS football (the so-called "Catholic 7"), plus invited founding members Butler, Creighton, and Xavier. The FBS schools sold the "Big East" name to the "Catholic 7" and are operating as the American Athletic Conference under the original Big East charter. Including the history of the original Big East, this will be the 18th season of men's soccer under the "Big East" name.

The defending champions are the Notre Dame Fighting Irish, who moved to the Atlantic Coast Conference.

Changes from 2012 

 Butler, Creighton and Xavier were invited by the "Catholic 7" to become founding members of the new Big East. 
 The FBS schools from the original Big East, along with several new members, are operating as the American Athletic Conference.

Season outlook

Teams

Stadia and locations

Standings

Tournament

Results

Statistics

References 

 
2013 NCAA Division I men's soccer season